Kirksville is an unincorporated community in Indian Creek Township, Monroe County, in the U.S. state of Indiana.

History
A post office was established at Kirksville in 1879, and remained in operation until 1905. The community was named for the Kirk family, who operated a store. Country music singer Junior Brown grew up near Kirksville.

Geography

References

Unincorporated communities in Monroe County, Indiana
Unincorporated communities in Indiana
Bloomington metropolitan area, Indiana